Cape Hatteras Electric Cooperative (CHEC) is a utility cooperative that distributes electricity to Hatteras and Ocracoke islands in the Outer Banks region of the state of North Carolina. The electric cooperative was founded in 1945 and is headquartered in Buxton.

Electricity
Cape Hatteras Electric Cooperative distributes electricity to 7,000 members on Hatteras and Ocracoke islands, both of which are barrier islands that are situated between the Atlantic Ocean and the Pamlico Sound in the Outer Banks region of the state of North Carolina. As an electric cooperative, Cape Hatteras Electric Cooperative is owned by the members who it provides electricity to. Cape Hatteras Electric Cooperative is a Touchstone Energy Cooperative and a member of the North Carolina Electric Membership Corporation (NCEMC), an electric generation and transmission cooperative that supplies electricity to most of North Carolina's electric cooperatives. Cape Hatteras Electric Cooperative receives its electricity supply from underground cables attached to the Herbert C. Bonner Bridge over the Oregon Inlet that connect to the Dominion North Carolina Power electric system. A diesel generation plant operated by the NCEMC is located in Buxton and is used during peak demand times and also to provide limited backup power to Cape Hatteras Electric Cooperative during times of transmission maintenance or emergencies.

History
Cape Hatteras Electric Cooperative was founded in 1945 to provide electricity to Hatteras Island, most of which lacked electricity at the time as investor-owned utilities did not find it profitable to serve the island. Prior to 1945, the only place on the island that had electricity was Hatteras Village. Originally, generators were the only power source on Hatteras Island, resulting in frequent power outages. In the 1960s, electric lines were constructed across the Herbert C. Bonner Bridge. A new cable across the bridge was built in 1995 at a cost of $10 million. In recent years, utility poles have been raised and new substations have been constructed. A new power line will be installed after the new Herbert C. Bonner Bridge is completed.

On July 27, 2017, a crew working on constructing a new Herbert C. Bonner Bridge severed the underground cable serving Cape Hatteras Electric Cooperative, causing a widespread power outage on Hatteras and Ocracoke islands. The power outage resulted in tourists being evacuated from Hatteras and Ocracoke islands during the peak of the summer vacation season. During the outage, a state of emergency was declared while residents were mandated to conserve their energy use, with emergency generators serving the islands. Power to Hatteras and Ocracoke islands was restored on August 3, with tourists allowed to return the next day. A $10.53 million settlement was reached, with PCL Civil Constructors denying guilt.

The new bridge was completed and opened to traffic on February 25, 2019, although some minor work remained to be performed, and a dedication ceremony was held on April 2, 2019 with NC Governor Roy Cooper as the keynote speaker.  However, it was not Herbert C. Bonner, but long-time NC state senator and leader Marc Basnight who was recognized in the naming ceremony.  Despite some objection from Hatteras Island residents and officials, and a NC BOT rule requiring unanimous consent by Dare County, the NC Board of Transportation made an exception and voted to name it after Senator Basnight, thus it is now the Marc Basnight Bridge over Oregon Inlet.

References

External links

Companies based in North Carolina
Energy companies established in 1945
Electric power companies of the United States
Electric cooperatives of the United States
1945 establishments in North Carolina
American companies established in 1945